Laura Macrì (born 29 June 1990 in Caltanissetta, Sicily, Italy) is an Italian soprano.

Biography 
Macrì studied at the Vincenzo Bellini Music Conservatory in Caltanissetta with Tiziana Arena and graduated cum laude in vocal studies. She attended numerous master classes with important artists such as Delia Surrat, Yva Barthélémy, Ines Salazar and Rolando Panerai.

She won the 1st prize at the 4th edition of the Regional Student Music Festival and was awarded a scholarship by the Dante Alighieri Society. She was a finalist in various important international competitions: 64th edition of the "Concorso Comunità Europea 2010" in Spoleto; the 2009/2010 edition of the Premio Nazionale delle Arti in Cuneo; the 1st edition of the "Concorso Internazionale Illica Opera Stage" in Castell'Arquato, where she won the engagement as Musetta (Florence), produced by Rolando Panerai and V. Hewitt, for the 2010/2011 season. Macrì also participated to the 7th edition of the "Piero Mongini" competition in Ispra, winning three prizes: 1st prize unanimously assigned by the jury, prize as youngest participant assigned by the Rotary Club and special prize assigned by the audience. Furthermore, she was finalist at the 2nd edition of the "Benvenuto Franci" competition in Pienza, where she was awarded a special mention as the youngest participant, prize offered by the Teatro Petruzzelli in Bari. She was finalist at the 25th edition of the "Iris Adami Corradetti" international competition in Padua, where she was awarded two scholarships and the participation to a prestigious master class that will bring her to sing in New York City. She was also finalist at, among others: the 41st edition of the Vincenzo Bellini competition in Caltanissetta (3rd place); and the 1st edition of the Marcello Giordani international competition, where she won the critics' choice award and a subsequent participation to a concert with the great tenor Marcello Giordani. Macrì recently sang Musetta in La bohème at the theatre in Campi Bisenzio, Florence.
She has toured all over the world performing several times together with 'Andrea Bocelli'.
With Bocelli she performed at renowned venues like:
MGM Grand Arena in Las Vegas, Barclays Arena in Brooklyn, US Airway Centre in Phoenix, Verizon Center in Washington, St. Pete Times Forum in Tampa, Phillis Arena in Atlanta, Atlas Arena in Lodz, Palace Square in St. Petersburg, Lanxess Arena in Cologne, National Stadium in Lima, Paseo Cayala in Guatemala City, Mexico City Arena, Movistar Arena in Santiago de Chile, Sala Palatului in Bucharest, Papp Laszlo Sport Arena in Budapest, Nokia Concert Hall in Tallinn & Wuhan Qintai Concert Hall in China.
In 2016 she was selected to be part of Pavarotti Foundation.
She took part to the concert in memory of Maestro Pavarotti “Qui dove il mare
luccica” in Modena and performed at the Arena di Verona for Opera on ice.
In January 2017 she performs as Rosina (Barbiere di Siviglia) at theater Niccolini in Florence
Laura just released her debut solo pop-opera album called: 'Terra' with producers Sascha Paeth (Avantasia) and Joost van den Broek (Ellen ten Damme, Kovacs).
She states: “This album is a dream coming true, I could finally put my whole heart and soul in the lyrics. I can use my voice in a way that really fits my personality. The lyrics were inspired by personal experiences: about friendships, grief and also some deeper philosophical themes”.

She recently performed in Carmen at the Teatro Petruzzelli in Bari, in La bohème in Florence and Le nozze di Figaro in Catania in Barbiere di Siviglia in Florence.

Her repertoire includes: Lucia in Lucia di Lammermoor; Musetta in La bohème, Adina in L'elisir d'amore, Gilda in the Rigoletto, Norina in Don Pasquale, Lauretta in Gianni Schicchi and Susanna in Nozze di Figaro.

Since 2011, she has been in a relationship with Epica's Mark Jansen.

Discography

Div4s

MaYaN 
2011: Quarterpast (choir, soprano)
2014: Antagonise (soprano)
2018: Dhyana (soprano)
2018: Undercurrent EP
2018: Metal Night at the Opera EP

Epica 
2012: Requiem for the Indifferent (choir, soprano)

Solo 
2014: Ancora Una Volta (single)
2014: Viva la Vita (single)
2015: Sempre (single)
2017: Terra (album)

References

External links 
MaYaN (official website)
Laura Macrì on Facebook

1990 births
People from Caltanissetta
Italian operatic sopranos
Women heavy metal singers
Italian heavy metal singers
Living people
21st-century Italian singers
21st-century Italian women singers
Mayan (band) members
Musicians from Sicily